Abdullah K. Zilkha (1913-2000) was a Swiss investment banker.

Early life
Abdullah Zilkha was born in Baghdad, Ottoman Empire the son of Khedouri Zilkha and Louise (Bashi) Zilkha.

Career
He was a member of the Zilkha Iraqi-Jewish banking family.

In the early 1970s, Zilkha's investment banking firm Ufitec, S.A., was a central player in the saving of the Penn Central from bankruptcy.  At the direction of Lloyd Cutler, the Washington, D.C. attorney, Zilkha met with Donald Prell, an executive with Union Bank Corp., in Zurich in late December 1971, to facilitate gaining consent of all bondholders to a refinancing so the U.S. railroad's assets could be preserved.

Personal life
He married Zmira (Mani) Zilkha, of the well-known Mani family of Hebron, great-granddaughter of the revered Kabbalist Rabbi Eliyahu Mani. She and her family survived the 1929 Hebron massacre. They had a son, Daniel A. Zilkha, born October 1, 1942, who became a New York City-based executive and philanthropist.

References

1913 births
2000 deaths
Swiss bankers
Iraqi Jews
People from Baghdad
Khedouri
Iraqi emigrants to Switzerland